Separation may refer to:

Films
 Separation (1967 film), a British feature film written by and starring Jane Arden and directed by Jack Bond
 La Séparation,  1994 French film
 A Separation, 2011 Iranian film
 Separation (2013 film), an American thriller film starring Sarah Manninen
 Separation (2021 film), an American horror film

Literature
 The Separation (Bury Novel), an 1830 novel by Lady Charlotte Bury
 The Separation (Priest novel), a 2002 novel by Christopher Priest
 The Separation (Applegate ovel), a 1999 novel in the Animorphs series by K.A. Applegate
 Separation, a 1976 Canadian political novel by Richard Rohmer

Music
 Separation (album), by American alternative rock band Balance and Composure (2011)
 Separation (EP), a 2006 EP by Halou
 Separates, album by 999
 Separations (album), a 1992 album by British alternative rock band Pulp
 Separation (band), a Swedish straight edge hardcore punk band
 Separation mastering, in music recording

Law and politics
 Marital separation, when a married couple ceases living together without a divorce
 Legal separation, a legal status where married couples may disentangle their finances without divorce
 Nonconformity to the world (separation from the world), a belief among some Protestant religious groups that the members of a church should be separate from "the world"
 Political separation (separatism), advocacy of a state of cultural, ethnic, tribal, religious, racial, governmental or gender separation from the larger group
 Separation of church and state, the idea that religion and government functions should be separate

Mathematics and science
 Separation (behavior), the behavior of flocking animals to stand off from their neighbours
 Separation (statistics), a problem encountered in fitting models for categorical outcomes
 Flow separation, separation of a fluid boundary layer from the surface of a solid body moving relative to the fluid
 Intertemporal portfolio choice#Time-independent decisions, where in some contexts portfolio choices for many periods can be made separately
 Separated sets, related concept in topology, two sets disjoint from the other's closure
 Separation axiom, concepts in the area of mathematics called topology
 Separation of concerns, in computer science (and problem-solving in general)
 Separation of variables, in mathematics to solve certain (separable) differential equations
 Separation principle, in control theory
 Separation process, in chemistry
 Separation theorem (disambiguation): several different theorems related to separation, in different scientific disciplines, for example:
 Mutual fund separation theorem, allowing a portfolio optimization problem to be separated into smaller problems
 Point-pair separation, in an order two pairs of points may or may not separate each other

Other uses
 Separation (aeronautics), rules to minimise the risk of collision between aircraft in flight
 Separation (United States military), the process by which a service member leaves active duty
 Separation anxiety disorder, an anxiety disorder in which an individual experiences excessive anxiety regarding separation from home and/or from people to whom the individual has a strong emotional attachment
 Racial separation, the separation of different racial groups in daily life
 Six degrees of separation, the idea that everyone is on average approximately six steps away, by way of introduction, from any other person on earth
 Curdling of an emulsion in cookery is called "separation"

See also
 
 
 Divide (disambiguation)
 Fragmentation (disambiguation)
 Part (disambiguation)
 Segregation (disambiguation)
 Separate (disambiguation)
 Split (disambiguation)